The 2017 Rugby Europe Women's Sevens Under 18 Trophy was held in Andorra from 22 to 24 September. This was Scotland's first international tournament. Germany won the Championship after defeating Belgium in the final.

Teams

Pool stages

Pool A

Pool B

Finals 
5th/8th Place Semi-finals

Cup Final

Final Standings

References 

2017–18 in European women's rugby union